Phyllocnistis magnoliella (magnolia serpentine leafminer moth) is a moth of the family Gracillariidae, known from the United States (Florida, Georgia, Louisiana, Virginia, Kentucky, Maryland, Pennsylvania, New Jersey and New York). The hostplants for the species include Magnolia acuminata, Magnolia grandiflora, Magnolia umbrella, and Magnolia virginiana.

References

 Forbes, W. T. M. (1923) The Lepidoptera of New York and neighbouring states. Part I. Primitive forms, Microlepidoptera, Pyraloids, Bombyces.: 1–729
 Bugguide.net. Species Phyllocnistis magnoliella - Magnolia Serpentine Leafminer Moth - Hodges#0851

Phyllocnistis
Endemic fauna of the United States
Moths of North America